Hill 60 may refer to:

 Battle of Hill 60 (disambiguation), a name shared by two battles of World War I:
 Battle of Hill 60 (Western Front) (April 17–April 22, 1915), fought south of Ypres in Belgium
 Battle of Hill 60 (Gallipoli) (August 21–August 29, 1915), the last major assault of the Battle of Gallipoli
 Hill 60 (Ypres), geographical feature and World War I battle site near Ypres, Belgium
 Hill 60 in Roundhay Park, Leeds, named in honour of those who had died in the WWI battles around Ypres
 Illowra Battery otherwise known as Hill 60, is a World War II fortification in Port Kembla, New South Wales, Australia
 "Hill 60" (The Unit), an episode of the television series The Unit

Battle honours of the British Army